St. Vincent (foaled 1951 in Great Britain) was a Thoroughbred racehorse who won in England and in the United States where he was a Champion  who set or equaled five turf course records including two new North American records.

St. Vincent was purchased by Canadians George R. Gardiner and the Alberta Ranches Ltd. partnership of U.S. Racing Hall of Fame jockey and Kentucky Derby-winning trainer Johnny Longden, his son Vance, and businessmen Frank McMahon, Wilder H. Ripley, and Max Bell.

Track and North American records
In 1955, St. Vincent was voted the American Champion Male Turf Horse after he equaled a track record and then set three new track records, two of which were North American marks:

 January 29: equaled track record at Santa Anita Park, 2:00 flat for 1 1/4 miles on turf.
 February 22: new North American record at Santa Anita Park, 2:25 2/5 for 1 1/2 miles on turf; 
 March 5: new track record at Santa Anita Park, 2:46 4/5 for 1 3/4 miles on turf;
May 21: new North American record: Pimlico Race Course, 2:15 2/5 for 1 3/8 miles on turf;

At age nine, St. Vincent made nineteen starts and won six times. He set another :
 new track record: Del Mar Racetrack, 1:33 flat for 7 furlongs

References

External links
 St. Vincent's pedigree and partial racing stats

1951 racehorse births
Thoroughbred family 22-a
Racehorses bred in the United Kingdom
Racehorses trained in the United Kingdom
Racehorses trained in the United States
American Champion racehorses